Katni District also known as Murwara District is one of the 52 districts of Madhya Pradesh state in central India. The town of Katni (Murwara) is the District headquarters. The District is part of Jabalpur Division. The District occupies an area of 4949.59 km².

Economy
Katni is a town in Madhya Pradesh with many laurels. It is also one of the largest rail junctions in the country and the second biggest diesel shed in the country is also located here. Katni is also a mineral-rich district, especially known for lime and bauxite.

In 2006 the Ministry of Panchayati Raj named Katni one of the country's 250 most backward districts (out of a total of 640). It is one of the 24 districts in Madhya Pradesh currently receiving funds from the Backward Regions Grant Fund Programme (BRGF).

Demographics

According to the 2011 census Katni District has a population of 1,292,042, roughly equal to the nation of Estonia or the US state of New Hampshire. This gives it a ranking of 379th in India (out of a total of 640).

Its population growth rate over the decade 2001-2011 was 21.38%. Katni has a sex ratio of 948 females for every 1000 males and a literacy rate of 73.62%. 20.41% of the population lives in urban areas. Scheduled Castes and Scheduled Tribes make up 12.05% and 24.59% of the population respectively.

Kols are the largest tribal group which is 41% of the tribal population, while Gonds (34%) and Bharias (20%) are the other major tribes.

At the time of the 2011 Census of India, 97.98% of the population in the district spoke Hindi and 1.56% Sindhi as their first language.

References

External links
Katni District
Katni city portal

 
Districts of Madhya Pradesh